Preobrazheniya Island, meaning 'Transfiguration Island', is an island in the Laptev Sea, Russia.

Geography 
The island is elongated and small. It is situated off the Northern mouth of the Khatanga Gulf (Russian: Хатангский залив), 15 km north of Bolshoy Begichev Island.

Preobrazheniya Island is 7 km in length and its maximum width is 2,5 km. This island is granitic and has high rocky cliffs on its eastern side. The west side of the island is sloping to a gravel beach.

History 
This island was useful as a landmark for ships plying the Northern Sea Route in the past. It is also known as "Ostrov Vstrechnyy". There is an abandoned Polar research station on Preobrazheniya.

Administration 
For administrative purposes Preobrazheniya Island belongs to the Sakha (Yakutia) Republic of the Russian Federation.

References 

 The Arctic Ocean Hydrographic Expedition 1910–1915
 On Preobrazheniya Station
 William Barr (Arctic historian), The Drift of Lenin's Convoy in the Laptev Sea, 1937–1938. (full text)
 William Barr, The First Soviet Convoy to the Mouth of the Lena.
 Picture of the island from a recent visit by a British yachtsman: http://www.sailnews.com/148.0.html?&tx_ttnews[cat]=56&tx_ttnews[tt_news]=4484&tx_ttnews[backPid]=147&cHash=a3f483c055

Islands of the Sakha Republic
Islands of the Laptev Sea